Francisco "Kiko" Martínez Cordero (June 20, 1912 – December 1, 1993) was a Mexican basketball player. He competed in the 1936 Summer Olympics.

Born in Ciudad Juárez, Martínez was part of the Mexican basketball team that won the bronze medal. He played in six of the squad's matches.

Following his Olympic experience, Martínez played college basketball at New Mexico A&M University (now New Mexico State University).  He played at the school from 1936 to 1939, earning first team All-Border Conference in 1938 and 1939.  As a senior, he led the Aggies to the 1939 National Invitation Tournament in New York City.

Martínez' grandson Román Martínez also represented Mexico as a part of the 2013 FIBA Americas Championship.  Mexico won the gold medal, qualifying for the 2014 FIBA Basketball World Cup in Spain.

References

External links

profile
XI JUEGOS OLIMPICOS BERLIN 1936 BRONCE | EQUIPO DE BALONCESTO 

1912 births
1993 deaths
Basketball players at the 1936 Summer Olympics
Mexican men's basketball players
Mexican expatriate basketball people in the United States
New Mexico State Aggies men's basketball players
Olympic basketball players of Mexico
Olympic bronze medalists for Mexico
Olympic medalists in basketball
Sportspeople from Ciudad Juárez
Basketball players from Chihuahua
Medalists at the 1936 Summer Olympics
Guards (basketball)